Henry Abel Dye Jr. (1926–1986) was an American mathematician, specializing in operator algebras and ergodic theory.

Education and career
Dye received from Rensselaer Polytechnic Institute a bachelor's degree and in 1950 a Ph.D. from the University of Chicago. As a postdoc he was from 1950 to 1952 at California Institute of Technology (Caltech) and from 1952 to 1953 at the Institute for Advanced Study. He was from 1953 to 1956 an assistant professor at the University of Iowa, from 1956 to 1959 an associate professor at the University of Southern California (USC), and from 1959 to 1960 a full professor at the University of Iowa. From 1960 until his death in 1986 he was a full professor at the University of California, Los Angeles (UCLA).

Selected publications

with Bernard Russo:

References

1926 births
1986 deaths
20th-century American mathematicians
Operator theorists
Rensselaer Polytechnic Institute alumni
University of Chicago alumni
University of California, Los Angeles faculty
People from Dunkirk, New York
Mathematicians from New York (state)